BKO may refer to:

 Senou International Airport, in Mali (IATA airport code: BKO)
 The Belorussian Communist Organisation, a communist group in Belarus
 Brookwood railway station (three-letter station code)
 Bindki Road, a railway station in India
 Baten Kaitos Origins, an RPG for the Nintendo Gamecube
Keiichi Okabe, Japanese music composer also known as "BKO"